Hole in the Wall is an American game show that has aired in two versions on American television.

The first version aired on the Fox television network from 2008 to 2009. The show was an adaptation of the Japanese game show  (meaning Brain Wall, nicknamed by YouTube fans as "Human Tetris") in which players must contort themselves to fit through cutouts in a large  by  Styrofoam wall moving towards them on a  track. FremantleMedia North America produced the series. Brooke Burns and Fox announcer Mark Thompson were the hosts of this version.  On May 20, 2008, Fox announced that it would commission 13 hours of Hole in the Wall from FremantleMedia North America. According to a Hollywood Reporter report, these hours could be split and aired as 26 episodes. Production began July 13, 2008, at CBS Studios-Radford.

Broadcast

Cancellation
On March 17, 2009, Fox pulled the series again, replacing it with reruns of King of the Hill and American Dad! The program's cancellation was announced in May 2009.

Revival
On July 20, 2010, Cartoon Network announced that it picked up the series, now updated for its younger audience. FremantleMedia would return as the show's producers. The series premiered October 6, 2010, with Real World Hawaii cast member Teck Holmes as host. Joining him as the show's lifeguard was model/lifeguard Emily Hedicke. A second cycle debuted in April 2011, and featured a new co-host, lifeguard Aaron Gingrich. On January 19, 2012, the CN version of Hole in the Wall aired its last episode.

Fox version (2008–2009)

Game play 
Two teams of three people play, with a hobby, occupation, or location as the team name. Two lifeguards, one male and one female, sit poolside. The contestants are dressed in the silver spandex zentai unitards and wear red or blue helmets, elbow pads, and knee pads depending on the team color.

A replay is shown after each wall has passed whether cleared or not. If a wall is not cleared, a diagram is shown of the best method.

One rule that is almost automatically assumed is that contestants must jump through the hole without breaking it all off or falling in the water. The rule that most players inadvertently break is that at least one foot must be in the play area.

Solo Wall 
After each team is announced, the team captain is then instructed to enter the play area. After a three-second countdown, the wall is shown. If the captain fails to get through, or "clear" the wall, either by falling into the pool or damaging the wall as it passes, the team earns zero points, clearing the wall earns one point. The opposing team captain then tries a different wall.

Double Wall 
The two non-captains on each team then complete on a Double Wall. The team earns two points if both players clear the wall, if either player fails to clear, they earn zero points.

Triple Wall 
All three players try to complete the Triple Wall. The team scores three points if all three clear the wall. If any player fails to clear, the team earns zero points.

Speed Wall 
Like Round 3, all three players complete. The wall moves twice as fast as before. Each player who clears the wall earns two points, for a maximum of six. In addition, if all three players clear the wall, they win a $5,000 bonus whether they win or lose the game. Both teams get a chance to play for the $5,000, even if the second team has been mathematically eliminated.

The team with more points wins a guaranteed $25,000 and plays the final "Blind Wall". If a tie game should occur, neither team wins the $25,000 but both advance to a sudden-death version of the Blind Wall.

Blind Wall 
One team member, blindfolded, is guided by Brooke to the center of the play area. The two remaining team members must then direct the blindfolded member through a standard solo wall by giving verbal commands, while the audience is asked to remain quiet. If the contestant clears the wall, the team wins $100,000. If both teams advance to the Blind Wall, the prize is split in half and each team tries a different blind wall for $50,000. During the show's opening run, there were only two teams that completed the blind wall. Raphael Xavier from the Freedom Rappers Philly team went through the blind wall, winning $50,000 due to a tie with the other team. The second was a teammate from the Gyrating Gents and they took home the full $100,000.

Broadcast history 
On October 24, 2008, Fox pulled the series from its schedule, replacing it with reruns of Kitchen Nightmares. On January 21, 2009, Fox pulled the series again and replaced it with reruns of Are You Smarter Than a 5th Grader? After an airing on February 8, 2009, the show was quickly put on hiatus. After another month, the series returned on March 8, 2009. Reruns of the series began airing on Fox Reality (now Nat Geo Wild) on May 25, 2009. The program's cancellation was announced in May 2009.

Special episodes 
The show's producers announced that they planned on shooting celebrity and themed episodes of the game, starting with contestants from VH1's Flavor of Love (Pumpkin (Brooke Thompson), Buckwild (Becky Johnston), Saaphyri Windsor) competing against Rock of Love 2 (Destiney Sue Moore, Ambre Lake, Jessica Kinni).

Phu and Leroy from Solitary 2 and Trizz from Solitary 3.0 teamed up as Backyard Wrestlers.

A special was also made for the Cartoon Network version, featuring the main casts from two of CN's live-action shows, Level Up and Dude, What Would Happen, in teams named "Level Up" and "The Dudes". Following the episode, new footage from the pilot movie for Level Up would air for the first time on the network.

Cartoon Network version (2010–2012)

Game play 
As was the case in previous versions, two teams of three people play. The difference is that the teams now consist of families. One member of each team is a child, and the second member must be the child's parent or guardian. The third member can either be one of the child's friends/siblings or a second parent/guardian. The contestants are dressed in the same attire from previous versions. (silver unitard, color coordinated helmets and pads)

The rules for the Double and Triple walls are the same, but points are now awarded based on how many players clear each wall, meaning that it is no longer required for every member to clear a group wall. In the normal rounds, ten points are usually given for each player who manage to clear the wall. In the speed round, however, the points are doubled.

Solo Wall 
One variation of this round uses the same rules as the end game in the Fox version, but a black cloth covered hockey goaltender mask is used instead of blacked out goggles. In a second variation, one player stands with his/her back to the wall, facing a teammate on the other side of the pool who will give instructions on how to fit through the hole. The third variation of this round is called "Black Out". In this wall, the player has to remember what the hole looks like, but with the stipulation being that the lights in the studio will constantly flicker. Success in this round scores ten points.

Double Wall 
Two on each team then compete on a Double Wall. Each player clearing the wall is worth ten points, with a maximum total of 20 points per round.

Triple Wall 
All three players try to clear the wall. Rules are the same as in the Fox version, with a total of 30 points at stake.

Speed Wall 
Similar to the Double Wall and the Speed Wall in the Fox version, but with a few variations. In the first variation, two people on each team try to clear a Double wall, the twist being that they are dizzy. Before the wall is revealed, two members from the team that isn't playing will spin their opponents, with the intent of making them dizzy. When the wall is revealed, the players are left by themselves to regain their balance and clear the wall. In a second variation, another Double wall is played, but the competitors have to clear it with a prop. In both variations, the wall moves twice as fast. Each player who clears the wall earns 20 points.

The team with the most points wins the Hole in the Wall trophy and plays the Imposso Wall. If both teams are tied, a tiebreaker wall is played.

Tiebreaker Wall
One player from each team is chosen to play. There are two variants of this wall. In the first variant, each player is given ten plastic balls. When the wall starts moving, the players must grab as many balls as possible, throw the balls through their hole, and clear the wall. The player who manages to get the most balls through their hole wins the competition for their team.
In the second variant, both players would be facing a wall with two identical holes in it. If one of the player clears the hole, then that player's team will be the winner. If both players clear the wall or both fall into the pool, then another player of each team is chosen to play until one of the player clears the hole.

Imposso Wall 
All three players of the winning team compete in the fifth round that has a final, more difficult wall, thus being named the Imposso Wall. In one variation, two players hold a jigsaw puzzle and must match the shape to both fit the puzzle and get themselves through. Another variation requires one of the three members to get through the wall while holding slippery balloons. In another variation, one player is blindfolded, another player wears ear muffs, and a third player is wearing a mouth piece. No matter the variation, if the wall is completed, the winning team will be immortalized in the Wall of Fame. Only four teams have conquered the Imposso Wall and got into the Wall of Fame.

In addition, the Cartoon Network website includes unaired footage from the show, which includes a wall called "The Killer Question", based on the British version of the show. Two players compete, facing a wall that displays a question and shapes that stand for two possible answers. If the players agree on the correct answer and move to that side, they can get through since that answer covers a hole, choosing the wrong answer leads them to hit a solid section and be swept into the pool.

Catchphrases 
"It's time to face the hole!" (Fox version; also used in the videogame)
"Show us the hole in the wall!" (CN version)

Amazon Prime Video 
Since 2017, prime members can view 18 episodes of the Fox version.

References

External links 
 Cartoon Network has picked up "Hole in the Wall"
 Fox to remake "Hole in the Wall"
 Fox game for Youtube smash "Hole in the Wall"
 Fox Punches "Hole in the Wall"
 Interview with Portia Berry Allen, the daughter of Fred "Rerun" Berry from who said "Oh, crap!" in the commercials
 

Cartoon Network original programming
Fox Broadcasting Company original programming
2000s American game shows
2010s American game shows
2008 American television series debuts
2009 American television series endings
2010 American television series debuts
2012 American television series endings
American television series revived after cancellation
Television series by Fremantle (company)
American television series based on Japanese television series
English-language television shows